Mark Helm may refer to:
 Mark Helm (lawyer)
 Mark Helm (footballer)
 Levon Helm (Mark Lavon Helm), American musician